Hajdari is a surname. Notable people with this surname include:

 Azem Hajdari (1963–1998), Albanian leader of the student movement in 1990–1991 that led to the fall of communism in Albania
 Blerti Hajdari (born 1990), Albanian footballer
 Gentjan Hajdari (born 1975), Albanian footballer
 Adrijan Hajdari (2004-2022)
Leader of Albanian Anti Terror Unit AATU

Albanian-language surnames